Brook Street Halt railway station served the town of Rhosllanerchrugog, Denbighshire, Wales, from 1905 to 1915 on the Pontcysyllte branch.

History 
Brook Street had been the goods station for Rhosllanerchrugog since the Great Western Railway opened the Rhos Branch in 1901. Here there were a goods office, a goods shed, a weighing machine, a 1-ton lifting crane and two sidings. As a result of the introduction of railmotor services the Brook Steet passenger halt was opened on the North side (opposite the goods shed) on 1 May 1905. On the south side of the level crossing was the ground level, timber-built signal box. Passenger trains ran as far South as Wynn Hall Halt, but with the closure of the Wynn Hall colliery passenger traffic reduced and when the bus services were introduced in 1912, the railmotor service to Wynn Hall became uneconomic and as a result passenger services south of Rhos station were withdrawn and the Brook Street Halt was closed on 22 March 1915. The signal box closed in 1927. The Pontcysyllte branch south of Rhos, remained open for goods traffic, and the goods office remained open until the line was closed.

References 

Disused railway stations in Denbighshire
Former Great Western Railway stations
Railway stations in Great Britain opened in 1905
Railway stations in Great Britain closed in 1915
1905 establishments in Wales
1915 disestablishments in Wales